Hendrik Scherpenhuijzen (3 April 1882 – 28 June 1971) was a Dutch fencer. He won a bronze medal in the team sabre competition at the 1924 Summer Olympics.

References

External links
 

1882 births
1971 deaths
Dutch male fencers
Olympic fencers of the Netherlands
Fencers at the 1924 Summer Olympics
Olympic bronze medalists for the Netherlands
Olympic medalists in fencing
Sportspeople from Rotterdam
Medalists at the 1924 Summer Olympics
20th-century Dutch people